Lieutenant-Colonel Tom Edwin Adlam VC (21 October 1893 – 28 May 1975) was an English recipient of the Victoria Cross, the highest and most prestigious award for gallantry in the face of the enemy that can be awarded to British and Commonwealth forces. A soldier with The Bedfordshire Regiment during the First World War, he was awarded the Victoria Cross for his actions on 27 September 1916, during the Battle of the Somme. He later served in the Second World War.

Adlam was twenty two years old, and a temporary second lieutenant in the 7th Battalion, The Bedfordshire Regiment, British Army during the First World War when the following deed took place on 27 September 1916 at Thiepval, France, for which he was awarded the Victoria Cross.

Major-General (later Lieutenant-General, Sir) Ivor Maxse, commanding 18th (Eastern) Division later wrote that Adlam's bravery and example and also his skilful handling of his unit was ‘chiefly responsible for the success of the two companies of the Bedfordshire regiment, who cleared and made good the last bit of the Thiepval objective ...It was, in fact, a successful minor operation without which the main attack on Schwaben Redoubt could not take place’.

When interviewed in 1973, Adlam declared: ‘Some officers would think that they had to do better than their own men.  But if I found a man who could do something better than me I’d say ‘Well do that’.  And I think they like it ... A man likes to be recognised as being a responsible person.’  Simkins would argue that this was an example of initiative being delegated down from division to the man on the spot, as early as the Somme battles.

In civilian life, Adlam was a teacher at Brook Street School in Basingstoke and a member of the National Union of Teachers.

Adlam served in the Second World War with the Royal Engineers (Movement Control Section), and achieved the rank of lieutenant colonel.

His Victoria Cross is displayed at Salisbury Guild Hall.

Adlam's voice was used in Peter Jackson's World War I film, They Shall Not Grow Old.

Footnotes

References
ADLAM, Lt-Col Tom Edwin, Who Was Who, A & C Black, 1920–2008; online edn, Oxford University Press, Dec 2007. Retrieved 19 November 2012
Tom Edwin ADLAM, V.C. – The Bedfordshire Regiment in the Great War
Monuments to Courage (David Harvey, 1999)
The Register of the Victoria Cross (This England, 1997)
VCs of the First World War - The Somme (Gerald Gliddon, 1994)

External links
Lieutenant Tom Edwin Adlam – Imperial War Museum (with photo)
Location of grave and VC medal (Hampshire)
Burial location of Tom Adlam "Hampshire"
Location of Tom Adlam's Victoria Cross "Salisbury Guild Hall"
Imperial War Museum Interview

1893 births
1975 deaths
British Army personnel of World War I
British Army personnel of World War II
British Battle of the Somme recipients of the Victoria Cross
Bedfordshire and Hertfordshire Regiment officers
People educated at Bishop Wordsworth's School
Royal Engineers officers
People from Salisbury
Schoolteachers from Hampshire
Recipients of the Silver Medal of Military Valor
British Army recipients of the Victoria Cross
Military personnel from Wiltshire